This is a list of high schools in the Essex County area, including Windsor, Ontario.

High schools belonging to the Windsor-Essex Catholic District School Board
Assumption College School
Cardinal Carter Catholic High School (Leamington)
Catholic Central High School
F. J. Brennan Catholic High School
Holy Names Catholic High School
Saint Anne Catholic High School
Saint Joseph's Catholic High School
Saint Michael's Catholic High School
Saint Thomas of Villanova Catholic High School

High schools belonging to the Greater Essex County District School Board
Belle River District High School 
Westview Freedom Academy 
Essex District High School  
General Amherst High School 
Harrow District High School 
Herman Secondary School 
Kennedy Collegiate Institute 
Kingsville District High School 
Leamington District Secondary School 
Public Alternative Secondary School 
Riverside Secondary School 
Sandwich Secondary School 
Vincent Massey Secondary School 
Walkerville Collegiate Institute 
Western Secondary School

High schools belonging to the Conseil scolaire catholique Providence
École secondaire catholique E.J. Lajeunesse
École secondaire l'Essor

High schools belonging to the Conseil scolaire Viamonde
École secondaire Lamothe-Cadillac

Independent High Schools
Windsor Islamic High School
UMEI Christian High School
Académie Ste Cécile International School
Maranatha Christian Secondary School

See also
List of high schools in Ontario

External links
WECDSB homepage
GECDSB homepage
Csc Providence homepage
Conseil Scolaire Viamonde (French-language schools in Ontario)
UMEI Christian High School

 
Windsor